The 81st Street–Museum of Natural History station is a local station on the IND Eighth Avenue Line of the New York City Subway. It is served by the B on weekdays, the C train at all times except nights, and the A train during late nights only.

History
The station opened on September 10, 1932, as part of the city-operated Independent Subway System (IND)'s initial segment, the Eighth Avenue Line between Chambers Street and 207th Street. While the IRT Broadway–Seventh Avenue Line already provided parallel service, the new Eighth Avenue subway via Central Park West provided an alternative route.

The station was renovated in 1998–2000, in coordination with building the new Hayden Planetarium, within the Rose Center for Earth and Space. The floors were replaced, new lighting was installed, the token booth was upgraded, and the walls and staircases were re-tiled. Structural improvements were also made during the renovation. In 2019, the Metropolitan Transportation Authority announced that the station would become ADA-accessible as part of the agency's 2020–2024 Capital Program.

Station layout

This underground station has four tracks and two side platforms. On this section of the line, the local tracks are stacked, uptown above downtown, and the express tracks are stacked in the same order to the east of them, so both platforms are on the west side, one above the other. The station is at Central Park West and 81st Street, rather than the major crosstown 79th Street, in order to accommodate the American Museum of Natural History, which largely fills the area of what was once called the Manhattan Square. The 79th Street Transverse Road, through Central Park, exits the park here.

South of this station are storage/lay up tracks between the local and express tracks on each level. Both ends of the tracks merge with the express tracks, with switches to the local tracks.

Exits
There are two fare control areas, both on the upper platform. One is at the station's extreme south end, on Central Park West midblock between 77th and 81st Streets. From this fare control, a passageway leads to a staircase on the west side of Central Park West, just south of the American Museum of Natural History's front entrance. This fare control also has an underground entrance directly into the museum's lowest level. The other is at the station's north end, at Central Park West and West 81st Street. There is one staircase each to the northwest and southwest corners of the intersection.

Artwork

In 1976, with funding from the Exxon Corporation, this station, as well as three others citywide, received new "artfully humorous graffiti" murals and artwork. Local designer Mayers and Schiff received $5,000 to add murals of dinosaurs such as "Thesaurus Rex, the dinosaur that had a vocabulary of a thousand words" and "Elongatomus, an elongated critter that stretched from coast to coast whose pelvic remains support a highway interchange in Missouri."

As part of the 1998–2000 station renovation, a program of tile mosaics was undertaken, covering the stairs and platforms, extending to floor inlays. Stairwells evoke descending into the geological strata of the Earth (at 81st Street) or into the Ocean (79th Street). Many creatures are evoked in mosaic vignettes that punctuate the stretches of white tiled wall. Fossil casts seem to emerge from the tiles as though the subway platform itself were an excavation, which it actually is. Under the Metropolitan Transportation Authority (MTA)'s Arts for Transit program, a mixed-media installation was created in 2000. Entitled "For Want of a Nail", named after the old proverb, it addresses the interconnections of entities that are as vast as a galaxy and as small as a single cell. Using ceramic tile, glass tile, glass mosaic, bronze relief, and granite as primary materials, the design team depicted the evolution of extinct, existing and endangered life forms, from single celled organisms to the towering T. rex dinosaur. It shows images and symbols ranging from the Earth's core, to the sea, the sky and the cosmos beyond. No artist has been identified in this group project.

In media 
The station has been featured in the 2002 film Men in Black II. The station was also mentioned in Night at the Museum.

References

External links 

 
 
 
 
 Corner of 81st Street and Central Park West subway entrance from Google Maps Street View
 Central Park West subway entrance in front of the American Museum of Natural History from Google Maps Street View
 Platform from Google Maps Street View

IND Eighth Avenue Line stations
Eighth Avenue (Manhattan)
New York City Subway stations in Manhattan
Railway stations in the United States opened in 1932
American Museum of Natural History
Upper West Side
Central Park
1932 establishments in New York City